The following are the national records in track cycling in Bulgaria maintained by the Bulgarian Cycling Union.

Men

Women

References

External links
 Official website

Bulgaria
Records
Track cycling
track cycling